The 2022 Southeastern Conference baseball season was the baseball season for the Southeastern Conference as part of the 2022 NCAA Division I baseball season. Tennessee and Texas A&M won the East and West Division regular season titles respectively. In the conference tournament, Tennessee defeated Florida 8–5 in the final to be crowned SEC champions.

Regular Season 
The Southeastern Conference released the regular season conference schedule on September 15, 2021. The regular season began March 18 and concluded May 21.

Division standings

Conference standings

Results

Tournament 

The 2022 Southeastern Conference baseball tournament was held from May 24 through May 29 at Hoover Metropolitan Stadium in Hoover, Alabama. Tennessee won the conference tournament for the first time since 1995.

Bracket

NCAA Tournament 

Nine SEC teams were selected for the NCAA tournament, with four being selected as regional hosts. Auburn, Florida, Tennessee, and Texas A&M were national seeds and hosted their respective regionals, while Arkansas, Georgia, LSU, Ole Miss, and Vanderbilt also were selected to the tournament. Six of the nine teams advanced to a regional final, with five advancing to the super regional round.

Texas A&M, Ole Miss, Auburn and Arkansas were four of the eight teams to advance to the 2022 College World Series in Omaha. Ultimately, Ole Miss swept Oklahoma in two games to claim the national championship.

Conference leaders

Awards and honors

SEC Baseball Awards 

Source: SEC

See also 
 2022 in baseball

References 

 
Southeastern Conference
Southeastern Conference baseball seasons